The Hopetoun Falls is a waterfall across the Aire River that is located in the Otways region of Victoria, Australia.

Location and features

Much attention has been given to preserving the natural characteristics of Hopetoun Falls while allowing ample access for visitors. The falls have a large set of well-built and maintained stairs that lead down a natural patio to a viewing platform very close to the foot of the waterfall. Hopetoun Falls plunges 30 m in a rectangular shape.

See also

List of waterfalls of Victoria

References

External links

Waterfalls of Victoria (Australia)
Otway Ranges